Damir Vuica (born 17 January 1972) is a Croatian retired footballer who played for NK Osijek, HNK Hajduk Split and NK Kamen Ingrad. He is considered one of the best Osijek´s players of all time.

Career
The long-haired Vuica played 295 official matches for Osijek in all competitions, putting him in third place with most appearances for the club after Mile Škorić and Bakir Beširević.

Vuica has the honour to be the most yellow-carded player in the history of the Croatian Football League with 104 in 372 games. He is also Osijek's record holder with 67.

He played in the Champions League for Hajduk, losing in the quarter-finals to eventual champions Ajax, and in Kamen Ingrad's only ever UEFA Cup run.

Personal life
Vuica is married to Jakica and the couple has two sons.

Career statistics

References

External links
 

1972 births
Living people
Sportspeople from Osijek
Association football defenders
Croatian footballers
NK Osijek players
HNK Hajduk Split players
NK Kamen Ingrad players
Croatian Football League players